was a Japanese film director and screenwriter.

Career
Morisaki was born in Nagasaki Prefecture and graduated from Kyoto University. After editing the film magazine Jidai Eiga, he joined the Shochiku studio in 1956. 

Moving from the Kyoto to Ofuna Studio, he wrote screenplays for Yoji Yamada's comedies and made his directorial debut in 1969 with Woman Can't Be Beaten. Known for his earthy, acerbic comedy, he also directed one episode of the Otoko wa Tsurai yo series. Turning freelance in 1975, he continued to make films. His last film, Pecoross' Mother and Her Days (2013), was made when he was 86 years old. He died on 16 July 2020 of a stroke at a hospital in Chigasaki, Kanagawa.

Awards
Morisaki was given a best new artist award in the film category of the Agency for Cultural Affairs's Geijutsu Senshō art awards for 1970, and then received the Minister of Education's award in the 2004 Geijutsu Senshō. He also received a special grand award for his career at the 25th Yokohama Film Festival in 1994. Pecoross' Mother and Her Days was selected as the best film of 2013 in the critics' polls conducted by both the Kinema Junpo and Eiga Geijutsu magazines.

Selected filmography
 Woman Can't Be Beaten (1969)
 Tora-san, His Tender Love (1970)
 Stray Dog (1973)
 Time and Tide (1983)
 Location (1984)
 The Nuclear Gypsies (1985)
 Guys Who Never Learn (1987)
 The Great Department Store Robbery (1987)
 Tsuribaka Nisshi Special (1994)
 Oishinbo (1996)
 Love Letter (1998)
 Chicken Is Barefoot (2004)
 Pecoross' Mother and Her Days (2013)

Bibliography

References

External links
 

Interview, Directors Guild of Japan 

Japanese film directors
1927 births
2020 deaths
Japanese screenwriters
People from Nagasaki Prefecture
Kyoto University alumni
Writers from Nagasaki Prefecture